The Thermal and Evolved Gas Analyzer (TEGA) is a scientific instrument aboard the Phoenix spacecraft, a Mars lander which landed and operated on the planet Mars in 2008. TEGA's design is based on experience gained from the failed Mars Polar Lander. Soil samples taken from the Martian surface by the robot arm are eventually delivered to the TEGA, where they are heated in an oven to about 1,000 °C. This heat causes the volatile compounds to be given off as gases which are sent to a mass spectrometer for analysis. This spectrometer is adjusted to measure particularly the isotope ratios for oxygen, carbon, nitrogen, and heavier gases. Detection values are as low as 10 parts per billion. The Phoenix TEGA has 8 ovens, which are enough for 8 samples.

Major components:
Differential Scanning Calorimeter 
Mass Spectrometer 

The soil was delivered to TEGA by a robotic arm with a scoop.

See also
CheMin
Sample Analysis at Mars
Urey instrument
Viking lander biological experiments (Viking program)
Mars Scout Program

References

External links
Phoenix site description of TEGA
TEGA archives software 
NASA TEGA

Mars Scout Program
Spacecraft instruments